Cantor Fitzgerald, L.P. is an American financial services firm that was founded in 1945. It specializes in institutional equity, fixed income sales and trading, and serving the middle market with investment banking services, prime brokerage, and commercial real estate financing. It is also active in new businesses, including advisory and asset management services, gaming technology, and e-commerce. It has more than 5,000 institutional clients.

Cantor Fitzgerald is one of 24 primary dealers that are authorized to trade US government securities with the Federal Reserve Bank of New York.

Cantor Fitzgerald's 1,600 employees work in more than 30 locations, including financial centers in the Americas, Europe, Asia-Pacific, and the Middle East. Together with its affiliates, Cantor Fitzgerald operates in more than 60 offices in 20 countries and has more than 12,500 employees.

In 2001, the firm's headquarters were destroyed in the September 11 attacks, killing every employee who reported to work that day.

Early history
Cantor Fitzgerald was formed in 1945 by Bernard Gerald Cantor and John Fitzgerald as an investment bank and brokerage business. It later became known for its computer-based bond brokerage, for the quality of its institutional distribution business model, and for being the market's premier dealer of government securities.

In 1965, Cantor Fitzgerald began "large block" sales/trading of equities for institutional customers. It became the world's first electronic marketplace for US government securities in 1972 and in 1983, it was the first to offer worldwide screen brokerage services in US government securities.

In 1991, Howard Lutnick was named president and CEO of Cantor Fitzgerald; he became chairman of Cantor Fitzgerald, L.P., in 1996.

9/11 attacks

Cantor Fitzgerald's corporate headquarters and New York City office, on the 101st to the 105th floors of One World Trade Center in Lower Manhattan (2 to 6 floors above the impact zone of American Airlines Flight 11), were destroyed during the September 11, 2001 attacks. At 8:46:46 a.m., six seconds after the tower was struck by the plane, a Goldman Sachs server issued an alert saying that its trading system had gone offline because it was unable to connect with the server. Since all stairwells leading past the impact zone were destroyed by the initial crash or blocked with smoke, fire, or debris, every employee who reported for work that morning was killed in the attacks; 658 of its 960 New York employees were killed or missing, or 68.5% of its total workforce, which was considerably more than any of the other World Trade Center tenants, the New York City Police Department, the Port Authority Police Department, the New York City Fire Department, or the Department of Defense. 46 contractors, food service workers, and visitors who were in the Cantor Fitzgerald offices at the time were also killed. CEO Howard Lutnick himself was not present because he was taking his son to his first day of kindergarten, but his younger brother, Gary, was among those killed. Lutnick vowed to keep the company alive, and the company was able to bring its trading markets back online within a week.

On September 19, Cantor Fitzgerald made a pledge to distribute 25% of the firm's profits for the next five years, and it committed to paying for ten years of health care for the benefit of the families of its 658 former Cantor Fitzgerald, eSpeed, and TradeSpark employees (profits that would otherwise have been distributed to the Cantor Fitzgerald partners). In 2006, the company had completed its promise, having paid a total of $180 million (and an additional $17 million from a relief fund run by Lutnick's sister, Edie).

Until the attacks, Cantor had handled about a quarter of the daily transactions in the multi-trillion dollar treasury security market. Cantor Fitzgerald has since rebuilt its infrastructure, partly by the efforts of its London office, and it now has its headquarters in Midtown Manhattan. The company's effort to regain its footing was the subject of Tom Barbash's 2003 book On Top of the World: Cantor Fitzgerald, Howard Lutnick, and 9/11: A Story of Loss and Renewal as well as a 2012 documentary, Out of the Clear Blue Sky.

On September 2, 2004, Cantor and other organizations filed a civil lawsuit against Saudi Arabia for allegedly providing money to the hijackers and Al Qaeda. It was later joined in the suit by the Port Authority of New York. Most of the claims against Saudi Arabia were dismissed on January 18, 2005.

In December 2013, Cantor Fitzgerald settled its lawsuit against American Airlines for $135 million. Cantor Fitzgerald had been suing for loss of property and interruption of business by alleging the airline to have been negligent by allowing hijackers to board Flight 11.

Recent history
In 2003, the firm launched its fixed income sales and trading group. Three years later, the Federal Reserve added Cantor Fitzgerald & Co. to its list of primary dealers. The firm later launched Cantor Prime Services in 2009. It was meant to be a provider of multi-asset, perimeter brokerage prime brokerage platforms to exploit its clearing, financing, and execution capabilities. A year after, Cantor Fitzgerald began building its real estate business with the launch of CCRE. Cantor's affiliate, BGC Partners, expanded into commercial real estate services in 2011 by its purchase of Newmark Knight Frank and the assets of Grubb & Ellis, to form Newmark Grubb Knight Frank.

On December 5, 2014, two Cantor Fitzgerald analysts were said to be in the top 25 analysts on TipRanks. Cantor Fitzgerald has a prolific special-purpose acquisition company underwriting practice, having led all banks in SPAC underwriting activity in both 2018 and 2019.

Philanthropy
Edie wrote An Unbroken Bond: The Untold Story of How the 658 Cantor Fitzgerald Families Faced the Tragedy of 9/11 and Beyond. All proceeds from the sale of the book benefit the Cantor Fitzgerald Relief Fund and the charities that it assists.

The Cantor Fitzgerald Relief Fund provided $10 million to families affected by Hurricane Sandy. Howard Lutnick and the Relief Fund "adopted" 19 elementary schools in impacted areas by distributing $1,000 prepaid debit cards to each family from the schools. A total of $10 million in funds was given to families affected by the storm.

Two days after the 2013 Moore tornado struck Moore, Oklahoma, killing 24 people and injuring hundreds, Lutnick pledged to donate $2 million to families affected by the tornado. The donation was given out in the form of $1,000 debit cards given out to families.

Each year, on September 11, Cantor Fitzgerald and its affiliate, BGC Partners, donate 100% of their revenue to charitable causes on their annual Charity Day, which was originally established to raise money to assist the families of the Cantor employees who died in the World Trade Center attacks. Since its inception, Charity Day has raised $110 million for charities globally.

Subsidiaries and affiliates
The firm has many subsidiaries and affiliates, including:

BGC Partners, named after fixed income trading innovator and founder B. Gerald Cantor, is a global brokerage company that services the wholesale financial markets and commercial real estate marketplace in New York, London, and other financial centers. BGC Partners includes Newmark Grubb Knight Frank, the fourth-largest real estate service provider in the US.
Cantor Ventures is the corporate venture capital and enterprise development arm of the company. Led by Henrique De Castro, the group's current investments include delivery.com, Ritani, TopLine Game Labs, AdFin, Lucera, NewsWhip, and XIX Entertainment.
Hollywood Stock Exchange, founded in 1996, is the world's virtual entertainment stock market.
TopLine Game Labs is a technology company to create short-duration fantasy sports and entertainment-based social gaming. Headquartered in Los Angeles, TopLine Game Labs was, in 2013, building a platform-agnostic architecture to power game experiences for sports.

Senior management

List of chairmen 
 Bernie Cantor (1945–1996)
 Howard Lutnick (1996–present)

List of CEOs 
 Bernie Cantor (1945–1991)
 Howard Lutnick (1991–present)

See also
 List of investment banks
 Boutique investment bank

References

External links

 
 Cantor Families Memorial
 Cantor Relief Fund
 On Top of the World: Cantor Fitzgerald, Howard Lutnick, and 9/11: A Story of Loss and Renewal
 Worst-Hit Firm Faults Fairness of Sept. 11 Aid, The New York Times, September 17, 2002

 
Banks based in New York City
Primary dealers
American companies established in 1945
Banks established in 1945
Investment banks in the United States
Financial derivative trading companies
September 11 attacks
1945 establishments in New York (state)